Sergio Manesio (born 1 July 1994) is a professional footballer who plays as a defensive midfielder or centre-back for FC Romania.

Career
Manesio was born in Angola before moving to London, England at the age of six where he played for Tottenham and West Bromwich Albion. He attended Cleveland State University between 2013 and 2016 where he played college soccer for the Cleveland State Vikings.

Ottawa Fury
In January 2017, Manesio signed with Ottawa Fury FC in the USL. Manesio was named as one of the Fury's two Newcomers of the Year at the end of the season.

In November 2017, Manesio re-signed with Ottawa for the 2018 season.

Return to England
Returning to England in 2019, he joined Hampton & Richmond and a few days later, Hendon, on a dual registration. After impressing during pre-season in the summer 2019, he joined Braintree Town. On 30 September 2019 Braintree confirmed, that Manesio had returned to Hendon. Manesio joined FC Romania for the 2020-21 season.

References

External links

1994 births
Living people
Association football midfielders
Angolan footballers
English footballers
Sportspeople from Cabinda Province
Footballers from Greater London
Angolan emigrants to the United Kingdom
Naturalised citizens of the United Kingdom
Angolan expatriate footballers
English expatriate footballers
Expatriate soccer players in the United States
Angolan expatriate sportspeople in the United States
English expatriate sportspeople in the United States
Expatriate soccer players in Canada
Angolan expatriate sportspeople in Canada
English expatriate sportspeople in Canada
Tottenham Hotspur F.C. players
West Bromwich Albion F.C. players
Cleveland State Vikings men's soccer players
Ottawa Fury FC players
Hampton & Richmond Borough F.C. players
Braintree Town F.C. players
Hendon F.C. players
F.C. Romania players
National Premier Soccer League players
USL Championship players
National League (English football) players
People from Cabinda (city)